Antoine Houdar de la Motte (18 January 167226 December 1731) was a French author.

De la Motte was born and died in Paris. In 1693 his comedy, Les Originaux (Les originaux, ou, l'Italien), was a complete failure, and so depressed the author that he contemplated joining the Trappists. Four years later he began writing texts for operas and ballets, e.g. L'Europe galante (1697), and tragedies, one of which, Inès de Castro (1723), was an immense success at the Theâtre Français. He was a champion of the moderns in the revived controversy of the ancients and moderns. His Fables nouvelles (1719) was regarded as a modernist manifesto.  Anne Dacier had published (1699) a translation of the Iliad, and La Motte, who knew no Greek, made a translation (1714) in verse founded on her work.

He said of his own work: "I have taken the liberty to change what I thought disagreeable in it." He defended the moderns in the Discours sur Homère prefixed to his translation, and in his Réflexions sur la critique (1716). Apart from the merits of the controversy, it was conducted on La Motte's side with a wit and politeness which compared very favourably with his opponents' methods. He was elected to the Académie Française in 1710, but soon afterwards went blind. La Motte carried on a correspondence with the duchesse du Maine, and was the friend of Fontenelle. He had the same freedom from prejudice and the same inquiring mind as the latter, and it is on the excellent prose in which his views are expressed that his reputation rests.

His Œuvres du theâtre (2 vols.) appeared in 1730, and his Œuvres (10 vols.) in 1754. See Hippolyte Rigault, Histoire de la querelle des anciens et des modernes (1859).

Poetry 

1701: Le Premier livre de l'Iliade, translated into French verse
1707: Églogue sur la naissance de Mgr le duc de Bretagne
 Odes
1707: Odes avec un Discours sur la poésie en général, et sur l'ode en particulier, (several latter editions)
1712: Le Deuil de la France, ode
1712: Le Souverain, ode
1716: Ode sur la mort de Louis le Grand, ode
1720: La critique, ode
 Fables
1714: Le Cygne, fable allegorique
1719: Fables nouvelles, Paris, (several latter editions)
1720: L'Indien et le soleil

Critics 

1714: Discours sur Homère
1715: Réflexions sur la critique, Paris, G. Du Puis
1719: Discours sur la fable, Paris, Grégoire Dupuis
1754: Discours sur la poésie, Paris, Prault l'aîné
1754: Discours sur la tragédie, Paris, Prault l'aîné
1730: Suite des Réflexions sur la tragédie

Theatre 

1693: Les Originaux ou l'Italien, three-act comedy, music by M. de Masse, presented at théâtre de l'Hôtel de Bourgogne, 13 August
1697: Issé, pastorale héroïque in 3 acts with prologue, présented at Château de Fontainebleau 7 October
1697: L'Europe galante, opéra-ballet in 4 acts and a prologue, music by André Campra, given at Théâtre du Palais-Royal (Académie royale de musique) 24 October 
1699: Amadis de Grèce, tragédie lyrique in 5 acts and a prologue, music by André Cardinal Destouches, given 25 March (Académie royale de musique)
1699: Marthésie, première reine des Amazones, tragédie lyrique in 5 acts and one prologue, music by André Cardinal Destouches, presented at Château de Fontainebleau 11 October 
1700: Le Triomphe des arts, opéra-ballet in 5 acts, music by Michel de La Barre, presented at théâtre du Palais-Royal (Académie royale de musique) 16 May
1700: Canente, tragédie lyrique in 5 acts and one prologue, music by Pascal Collasse and Antoine Dauvergne, presented at Théâtre du Palais-Royal (Académie royale de musique) 4 November 
1701: Les Trois Gascons, comédie avec divertissements in 1 act, with Nicolas Boindin, music by Giuseppe Maria Cambini and Nicolas Racot de Grandval, dit Grandval le Père, presented at Comédie-Française 4 June
1701: Omphale, tragédie lyrique in 5 acts and one prologue, music by André Cardinal Destouches, presented at Théâtre du Palais-Royal (Académie royale de musique) 10 November
1702: La Matrone d'Éphèse, comedy in 1 act and in prose, presented at Comédie-Française 23 September
1703: Le Carnaval et la folie, comédie-ballet in 4 acts and one prologue, music by André Cardinal Destouches, presented at Château de Fontainebleau 3 January
1704: Le Port de mer, comedy in 1 act and in prose, with Nicolas Boindin, music by Nicolas Racot de Grandval, called Grandval le Père, presented at Comédie-Française 27 May
1705: La Vénitienne, opéra-ballet in one prologue and 3 acts, music by Michel de La Barre, presented at Théâtre du Palais-Royal (Académie royale de musique) 26 May; reset on music by Antoine Dauvergne, Académie royale de musique, 6 May 1768
1709: Sémélé, tragédie lyrique in 5 acts, music by Marin Marais, presented at Théâtre du Palais-Royal (Académie royale de musique) 9 April
1715: La Ceinture de Vénus, tableau dramatique, music by Jean-Joseph Mouret, presented at Château de Sceaux 19 April
1706: Alcione, tragédie lyrique in 5 acts and a prologue, music by Marin Marais, presented at Théâtre du Palais-Royal (Académie royale de musique), 18 February
1715: Apollon et les muses, tableau dramatique, music by Jean-Joseph Mouret, presented at Château de Sceaux 19 April
1716: L'Amante difficile ou l'amant constant, comedy in 5 acts and in prose, with Pierre Rémond de Sainte-Albine, presented at Théâtre de l'Hôtel de Bourgogne 17 October
1721: Les Macchabées, tragedy in 5 acts and in verse, presented à la Comédie-Française 6 March
1722: Romulus, tragedy in 5 acts and in verse, presented at Comédie-Française 8 January
1723: Inès de Castro, tragedy in 5 acts and in verse, presented at Comédie-Française 6 April
1726: Œdipe, tragedy in 5 acts and in verse, presented at Comédie-Française 18 March
1730: Dalcyone, opera, presented in September
1731: L'Italie galante ou les contes, comedy in one prologue and 3 parts (Le Talisman, Richard Minutolo, Le Magnifique), presented at Comédie-Française 11 May
1731: L'Amante difficile, divertissement in 5 acts and in prose, music by Jean-Joseph Mouret, presented at Théâtre de l'Hôtel de Bourgogne 23 August
1735: Scanderberg, tragédie lyrique in 5 acts and a prologue, with Jean-Louis-Ignace de La Serre, music by François Francœur and François Rebel, presented at Théâtre du Palais-Royal (Académie royale de musique) 25 October
1748: Pygmalion, ballet, reworked by Ballot de Sauvot, music by Jean-Philippe Rameau, presented at Château de Fontainebleau 27 August
1753: Prométhée, prologue in verse, presented in Paris 9 January
1753: Titon et l'Aurore, pastorale héroïque in 3 acts, with Claude-Henri de Fusée de Voisenon and abbé de La Marre, music by Jean-Joseph Cassanéa de Mondonville, presented at Théâtre du Palais-Royal (Académie royale de musique) 9 January
1753: Le Magnifique, comedy in 2 acts and one prologue with three intermèdes, presented at château de Fontainebleau 15 November
 Le Ballet des fées, ballet
 Le Calendrier des vieillards, comedy in 1 act and in prose
 Climène, pastorale in 1 act and in verse
 Les Âges, opéra-ballet in 4 acts and one prologue

External links 
 Antoine Houdar de La Motte on Wikisource
 Biographical information at l'Académie française
 His plays and their presentations on CÉSAR
 Fiche on http://baroquelibretto.free.fr
 L'Iliade interprétée by Houdar de la Motte
 Discours sur Homère de Houdar de la Motte (1714) and in modern French
 Fables choisies de l'Abbé Aubert et de Lamotte-Houdart ("sic") (212 pages) on Gallica

Bibliography 
 Maurice Allem, Anthologie poétique française, XVIIIe, Paris, Garnier Frères, 1919
 E. Dacier, « Le Premier Livre illustré au XVIIIe : les Fables de La Motte et les vignettes de Claude Gillot », in Trésors des bibliothèques de France, 1929, tome II, (p. 1-14)
 Paul Dupont, Un Poète philosophe au commencement du XVIIIe : Houdar de La Motte (1672–1731), Thèse présentée à la Faculté des lettres de l'Université de Paris, Paris, Hachette, 1898
 Cardinal Georges Grente (dir.), Dictionnaire des lettres françaises. Le XVIIIe, nlle. édition revue et mise à jour sous la direction de François Moureau, Paris, Fayard, 1995
 François Moureau, « Les Fables nouvelles (1719) de La Motte ou comment s'en débarrasser », Le Fablier, #2, 1990
 J.G. Robertson, « Sources italiennes des Paradoxes dramatiques de La Motte », Rev. littérature comparée, 1923, (p. 369-375)
 Claude-Sixte Sautreau de Marsy, Précis sur la vie et les ouvrages d'Houdar de La Motte, Paris, 1785

References

1672 births
1731 deaths
Writers from Paris
Members of the Académie Française
17th-century French dramatists and playwrights
18th-century French dramatists and playwrights
17th-century French male writers
18th-century French writers
18th-century French male writers
French opera librettists
French fabulists